Omadhoo (Dhivehi: އޮމަދޫ) is one of the inhabited islands of Thaa Atoll.

Geography

Demography

References

External links
 Kinbidhoo News

Islands of the Maldives